Franz Carl Bornschein (February 10, 1879 – June 8, 1948) was an American composer, teacher, and music critic. Born in Baltimore, Maryland, he studied at the Peabody Conservatory of Music, later becoming a professor there. He also served for a time as the music critic of the Baltimore Evening Sun. His wife, Hazel Knox, was a singer who taught at Peabody. Much of Bornschein's output is orchestral, including a number of suites as well as a violin concerto; he also wrote a good deal of chamber music, some songs, and some works for choir which won a handful of prizes. In larger forms, he wrote cantatas, oratorios, and operettas.

Bornschein died in 1948; his papers are held at the library of the Maryland Historical Society in Baltimore.

Selected compositions 

 Joy, choral setting of Walt Whitman's The Mystic Trumpeter, joint winner of the National Federation of Music Clubs' 1943 choral composition contest.

References

External links
Bornschein papers at the MHS

1879 births
1948 deaths
American male composers
American composers
Musicians from Baltimore
Place of death missing